Khiji Chandeswori Domestic Airport (also known as Khiji Demba Airport) is a domestic airport in Khiji Chandeshwari in Okhaldhunga District in Koshi Province  in Nepal.  The airport is being constructed with the joint effort of Khijidemba Rural Municipality and the provincial government.

Facilities

Airlines and destinations

Tara Air has already conducted a test flight to this airport and is planning to operate scheduled services to Kathmandu.

References

Airports in Nepal
Buildings and structures in Okhaldhunga District
Airports established in 2019
2019 establishments in Nepal